Chashin or Cheshin may refer to:
 Chashin, Hamadan
 Chashin, Zanjan